Kolka parish is an administrative unit of Talsi Municipality in the Courland region of Latvia.

Villages of Kolka parish 
 Kolka - parish administrative center
 Košrags
 Mazirbe
 Pitrags
 Saunags
 Sīkrags
 Uši
 Vaide

References

External links

Parishes of Latvia
Talsi Municipality
Courland